Eygurande is a commune in the Corrèze department in central France.

Population

Sights
Arboretum du Massif des Agriers

See also
Communes of the Corrèze department

References

Communes of Corrèze
Limousin
Corrèze communes articles needing translation from French Wikipedia